Ankara Elementary/High School is a public K-12 school in Ankara, Turkey, operated by Department of Defense Education Activity (DoDEA).

See also
 List of high schools in Turkey
 List of schools in United States territories

References

External links
 Ankara Elementary/High School

American international schools in Turkey
Elementary
Schools in Ankara